Deborah Fatima Carthy-Deu (born January 5, 1966) is a Puerto Rican actress, TV host and beauty queen. She was the second Puerto Rican  Miss Universe

Biography

Early years
Deborah Fatima Carthy-Deu was born on January 5, 1966, in the Santurce district of San Juan to Ramón Carthy Sanchez and Vicky Sanz Deu, of Irish-Colombian and Spanish-Puerto Rican descent. Her mother directed an academy for ballet and modeling, Academia de Ballet y Modelaje Vicky Sanz, under the name of Vicky Sanz. Her father was a photography director. At age nine she started to take ballet classes at her mother's school. She was trained as a classical ballerina. She attended a Catholic elementary school and later enrolled in the ninth grade at Commonwealth High School. From age thirteen, she spent her summers in New York City taking dance classes. She later attended the University of Puerto Rico and pursued a major in drama. At thirteen, she also auditioned for Ballet Concierto and became part of the dance company and later a soloist.

Miss Universe
While she was in college, she was selected Miss San Juan on March 22, 1985, and later Miss Puerto Rico on April 27, 1985. On July 15, 1985, she was crowned Miss Universe 1985 representing Puerto Rico in Miami, Florida.

After traveling the world as Miss Universe, she went to Argentina to play the leading character in the telenovela El Cisne Blanco. This allowed her to continue working as an actress and a model internationally, as well as a television host for both Univision and Telemundo Network.

After Miss Universe
Carthy-Deu graduated magna cum laude from the University of Puerto Rico and obtained the Theater Medal, awarded to the most distinguished graduate. She majored in theater arts and education.

As an actress, she has worked both in theater and television and has earned the respect of critics for her participation, both in comedies and dramas.

She owns a modeling and finishing school, known as Deborah Carthy Deu Estudio y Agencia de Modelos, in which she helps girls and women to develop social skills and self-esteem, as well as to start careers in modeling, the arts, television and participation in beauty pageants.

Carthy-Deu has hosted several television shows in Puerto Rico, New York and Miami, working for both Univision and the Telemundo network on television programs such as Noche de Gala, (Gala Night Ball) with Eddie Miró, Desde Mi Pueblo, (From My Town) with Yoyo Boing and Tony Croatto, and La Buena Vida.

She wrote a column for The San Juan Star. and had a fashion review on the entertainment magazine known Teve Guia until the publication closed.

From 2007 to 2009, Carthy-Deu hosted a remake of Noche de Gala, produced by Paquito Cordero and broadcast by WIPR-TV.

Since 2003, she has been a fashion contributor for WAPA's newscast Noticentro Al Amanecer.

In December 2017, Carthy-Deu helped with the aftermath of Hurricane Maria by going door-to-door with the Federal Emergency Management Agency (FEMA) to help inspect residential damage.

See also

List of Puerto Ricans
Irish immigration to Puerto Rico
History of women in Puerto Rico

References

Living people
Miss Puerto Rico winners
Miss Universe 1985 contestants
Miss Universe winners
People from Santurce, Puerto Rico
Puerto Rican female models
Puerto Rican people of Catalan descent
Puerto Rican people of Irish descent
Puerto Rican people of Spanish descent
Puerto Rican beauty pageant winners
1966 births